Bonnie Milligan is a musical theater performer and television actor, known for her "belting" style of singing and wide vocal range.

In 2012, Milligan was described as "scene-stealing" in the Flea Theater's production of "Restoration Comedy," by playwright Amy Freed. Beginning in 2014, she played Pat in the first national tour of Kinky Boots, a role she continued in until 2017. In 2018, Milligan made her Broadway debut in Head Over Heels, originating the role of Pamela, for which she won a Theatre World Award in 2019. More recently, Milligan won the 2022  Lucille Lortel Award and was nominated for an Outer Critics Circle Award for her featured performance as Debra in Kimberly Akimbo at Atlantic Theatre Company. From February - March 2022, Milligan starred as Lorraine in the Delaware Theatre Company World Premiere theatre production of Hunter Bell, Jeff Bowen and Ann McNamee's Other World. In the fall of 2022, Kimberly Akimbo opened on Broadway, with Milligan continuing in her role. Milligan has been a vocal advocate for body positivity.

Meanwhile, in television Milligan's most prominent role has been portraying Katherine Winterbottom in the television show Search Party from 2016 to 2022.

As of May 2022, a YouTube video of Milligan performing a medley duet with Laura Osnes of mostly Disney princess songs as part of Milligan's "Belting Bonnie's Bon Voyage" show in 2014 at Feinstein's/54 Below had been viewed more than 2.5 million times.

Early life
Milligan is originally from Illinois and Ohio. The daughter of a Protestant minister, she has stated that her parents divorced when she was sixteen and that her mother, with whom she lived, often had financial trouble. Like many struggling performers in New York, Milligan worked as a waiter while going to auditions before breaking through in her performing career.

Awards and nominations

References

External links
 
 
 
 
 

Off-Broadway
American musical theatre actresses
Date of birth missing (living people)

Year of birth missing (living people)
Living people
People from Decatur, Illinois